William Mouat Bolt (1838 – 29 April 1907) was a member of the New Zealand Legislative Council from 15 October 1892 to 15 October 1899; 16 October 1899 to 15 October 1906; and 16 October 1906 to 29 April 1907, when he died aged 68 years. He was appointed by the Liberal Government.

He was from Dunedin.

References 

1838 births
1907 deaths
Members of the New Zealand Legislative Council
New Zealand Liberal Party MLCs
19th-century New Zealand politicians